The 1986 Speedway World Team Cup was the 27th edition of the FIM Speedway World Team Cup to determine the team world champions.

A new format was started in 1986 whereby teams were seeded into groups, with Group 1 containing the leading nations competing over three legs to determine the champions. A promotion and relegation system was in place for the groups. Denmark won all three legs and therefore easily won their fourth consecutive title (and sixth in total) equalling Sweden's six titles and moving into equal second place in the all time list. It was also Hans Nielsen's sixth gold medal having taken part in all of Denmark's title wins.

Group 4
Calendar

 Winner promoted to Group 3 in 1987

Round 1

 May 4, 1986
  Krsko

Round 2

 June 22, 1986
  Skien

Round 3

 August 18, 1986
  Amsterdam

 3 Yugoslav riders did not arrive at Amsterdam, and were then banned from appearing in the Wiener Neustadt round by the Yugolsav Federation. At Amsterdam they were replaced by Dutch reserves, whose points did not count in the Yugoslav team score.

Round 4

 September 7, 1986
  Wiener Neustadt

Group 3

Calendar

 Winner promoted to Group 2 in 1987 ; 4th relegated to Group 4 in 1987

Round 1

 June 22, 1986
  Lonigo

Round 2

 August 10, 1986
  Tampere

Round 3

 September 7, 1986
  Debrecen

Group 2

calendar

 Winner promoted to Group 1 in 1987 ; 4th relegated to Group 3 in 1987

Round 1

 May 4, 1986
  Krumbach

Round 2

 June 22, 1986
  Zarnovica

Round 3

 August 10, 1986
  Norden

Round 4

 September 6, 1986
  Leszno

Group 1 (FINAL GROUP)

Calendar

 4th relegated to Group 2 in 1987

Round 1
 August 7, 1986
  Göteborg, Ullevi
 Att: 4,083
 Ref: Jorgen Jensen (Den)

Round 2
 August 8, 1986
  Vojens, Speedway Center
 Att: 13,000
 Ref: C Ringstrom (Swe)

Round 3

 August 17, 1986
  Bradford, Odsal Stadium
 Att: 3,585
 Ref: R Randborg (Swe)

Final standings

See also
 1986 Individual Speedway World Championship
 1986 Speedway World Pairs Championship

References

Speedway World Team Cup
1986 in speedway